Henry Chandler Bowen (September 11, 1813  – February 24, 1896) was an American businessman, philanthropist, and publisher.  He was an influential member of Plymouth Church in Brooklyn, where he resided much of his life, and the founder of the New York-based newspaper The Independent.  He built a Gothic-style summer home named Roseland Cottage in Woodstock, Connecticut, his place of birth.

Early life and education
Henry Chandler Bowen was born on September 11, 1813 in Woodstock, the son of George Bowen and Lydia Wolcott Bowen (née Eaton).  He was educated at Woodstock Academy and Dudley Academy.

Career
He moved to New York City and joined a dry-goods company owned by the abolitionist Arthur Tappan.  Later he would open his own company Bowen and McNamee, specializing in silks.  He opened a store on 112-114 Broadway, an Italian Marble building designed by English architect Joseph C. Wells, an architect he would work with later.  The company was renamed Bowen, Holmes and Company in 1859.

In 1848, Bowen founded The Independent, a weekly congregationalist newspaper that was closely associated with Plymouth Church in Brooklyn Heights, of which he was a founding member.  Plymouth's minister, Henry Ward Beecher, was the editor from 1861 to 1863 and a frequent contributor.  The paper was strongly pro-abolitionist and pro-women's suffrage.  Bowen served as the newspaper's chief financier and publisher, and from 1870 until his death he was the editor as well.  The paper has a circulation of 70,000 in 1870.

Abraham Lincoln was a subscriber of The Independent.  Bowen was a key figure in inviting Lincoln to speak in New York at the Cooper Institute in February 1860, during which time he accepted Bowen's invitation to attend Plymouth Church to hear Beecher's sermon.

During the Civil War, Bowen lost most of his clients for his silk business (many from the South) and the company Bowen, Holmes and Company went bankrupt.  By this time, he also had considerable income from the fire insurance business as well as his newspaper The Independent.  in 1853 he established the Continental Insurance Company.

Personal life

He married Lucy Maria, daughter of Lewis Tappan, on June 6, 1844 and they had 10 children. He later married Ellen Holt on December 25, 1865.

In 1846, he hired architect Joseph Wells to build a summer home in Gothic Revival style called Roseland Cottage in Woodstock.  The house is preserved today and is a National Historic Landmark.

He was a founding member of the Congregationalist Church of the Pilgrims. Two years later he was a founding member of Plymouth Church in Brooklyn Heights.  Plymouth Church was designed by Joseph Wells.  He and his family moved into a house at 90 Willow Street in the late 1840s or 1850s.

He was involved in litigation with Beecher and Theodore Tilton which was settled in 1872.

Starting in 1870, Bowen hosted large Fourth of July celebrations at Roseland Cottage. Four United States Presidents visited Bowen's summer home as his guests and speakers for these celebrations: Ulysses S. Grant, Benjamin Harrison, Rutherford B. Hayes, and William McKinley. Other prominent visitors included Henry Ward Beecher, Julia Ward Howe, Oliver Wendell Holmes and John C. Fremont.

Bowen made large philanthropic gifts to his hometown of Woodstock, CT.  He made an endowment to his school Woodstock Academy.  He presented Roseland Park to the town in 1876.

Notes

References

External links

1813 births
1896 deaths
People from Brooklyn
American business executives
American abolitionists
People from Woodstock, Connecticut
19th-century American businesspeople